The 2013–14 Campionato Sammarinese di Calcio season was the twenty-ninth since its establishment. The league is the uppermost in San Marino, in which the country's top 15 amateur football clubs play. The season began on 13 September 2013 and ended with the play-off final on 27 May 2014.

Participating teams

Because there is no promotion or relegation in the league, the same 15 teams who competed in the league last season will compete in the league this season.
 S.P. Cailungo (Borgo Maggiore)
 S.S. Cosmos (Serravalle)
 F.C. Domagnano (Domagnano)
 S.C. Faetano (Faetano)
 F.C. Fiorentino (Fiorentino)
 S.S. Folgore/Falciano (Serravalle)
 A.C. Juvenes/Dogana (Serravalle)
 S.P. La Fiorita (Montegiardino)
 A.C. Libertas (Borgo Maggiore)
 S.S. Murata (San Marino)
 S.S. Pennarossa (Chiesanuova)
 S.S. San Giovanni (Borgo Maggiore)
 S.P. Tre Fiori (Fiorentino)
 S.P. Tre Penne (Serravalle)
 S.S. Virtus (Acquaviva)

Regular season
The 15 clubs are split into two groups; one with eight clubs and another with seven clubs.

Group A

Group B

Results
All teams will play twice against the teams within their own group and once against the teams from the other group. This means that the clubs in the eight-club group will play 21 matches each while the clubs in the seven-club group will play 20 matches each during the regular season.

Play-offs
The play-offs were held in a double-eliminination format. Both group winners (Tre Fiori and La Fiorita) earned byes in the first and second round.

First round

Second round

 
Tre Penne eliminated.

Third round

Faetano eliminated.

Fourth round

Cosmos eliminated.

Fifth round

Tre Fiori eliminated.

Final

La Fiorita qualifies for 2014–15 UEFA Champions League first qualifying round,
Folgore qualifies for 2014–15 UEFA Europa League first qualifying round.

References 

Campionato Sammarinese di Calcio
San Marino
1